Nataraja also known as Adalvallan is a depiction of the Hindu god Shiva as the divine cosmic dancer. His dance is called the tandava. The pose and artwork are described in many Hindu texts such as the Tevaram and Thiruvasagam in Tamil and the Amshumadagama and Uttarakamika agama in Sanskrit and the Grantha texts. The dance murti featured in all major Hindu temples of Shaivism, and is a well-known sculptural symbol in India and popularly used as a symbol of Indian culture, as one of the finest illustrations of Hindu art. This form is also referred to as Kuththan, Sabesan, and Ambalavanan in various Tamil texts.

The sculpture is symbolic of Shiva as the lord of dance and dramatic arts, with its style and proportions made according to Hindu texts on arts. Tamil devotional texts such as the Tirumurai (The twelve books of Southern Shaivism) state that Nataraja is the form of Shiva in which he performs his functions of creation, destruction, preservation, and is also attributed with maya and the act of blessing his devotees. Thus, Nataraja is considered one of the highest forms of Shiva in Tamil Nadu, and the sculpture or the bronze idol of Nataraja is worshipped in almost all Shiva temples across Tamil Nadu. It typically shows Shiva dancing in one of the Natya Shastra poses, holding various symbols which vary with historic period and region, trampling upon a demon shown as a dwarf (Apasmara or Muyalaka) who symbolizes spiritual ignorance.

The classical form of the depiction appears in a pillar of rock cut temple at Seeyamangalam – Avanibhajana Pallaveshwaram Temple constructed by a Pallava King Mahendravarman I in 6th century CE, which is known by Archeological Survey of India and Archeological Survey of Tamil Nadu as the oldest known Nataraja sculpture in India. The stone reliefs at the Ellora Caves and the Badami Caves, by around the 6th century, are also among the oldest Nataraja sculptures in India. Ancient Tamil songs during the Bhakti movement written by the four Shaivite saints of Sambandar, Appar, Manikkavacakar, and Sundarar, popularly known as "Nalvar" (The four) extol Nataraja and describes the Nataraja Temple, Chidambaram as the home of Nataraja as the main deity, dating Nataraja worship way before the 7th century CE. Around the 8th to 10th century, statues emerged in Tamil Nadu in its mature and best-known expression in Chola bronzes, of various heights typically less than four feet, some over. Nataraja reliefs have been found in many parts of South East Asia such as Angkor Wat and in Bali, Cambodia, and Central Asia.

Etymology

The word Nataraja is a Sanskrit term, from नट Nata meaning "act, drama, dance" and राज Raja meaning "king, lord"; it can be roughly translated as Lord of the dance or King of the dance. According to Ananda Coomaraswamy, the name is related to Shiva's fame as the "Lord of Dancers" or "King of Actors".

The form is known as Nataraja in Tamil Nadu and as Narteśvara (also written Nateshwar) or Nṛityeśvara in North India, with all three terms meaning "Lord of the dance". Narteśvara stems from Nṛtta same as Nata which means "act, drama, dance" and Ishvara meaning "lord". Natesa (IAST: Naṭeśa) is another alternate equivalent term for Nataraja found in 1st-millennium sculptures and archeological sites across the Indian subcontinent.

In Tamil, he is also known as “Sabesan” which splits as “Sabayil aadum eesan” which means “The Lord who dances on the dais”.  This form is present in most Shiva temples, and is the prime deity in the Nataraja Temple at Chidambaram (Tillai). The dance of Shiva in Chidambaram forms the motif for all the depictions of Shiva as Nataraja. Koothan(), Sabesan(), Ambalavanan are other common names of Nataraja in Tamil texts.

Depiction

The two most common forms of Shiva's dance are the Lasya (the gentle form of dance), associated with the creation of the world, and the Ananda Tandava (dance of bliss, the vigorous form of dance), associated with the destruction of weary worldviews—weary perspectives and lifestyles. In essence, the Lasya and the Tandava are just two aspects of Shiva’s nature; for he destroys in order to create, tearing down to build again.

According to Alice Boner, the historic Nataraja artworks found in different parts of India are set in geometric patterns and along symmetric lines, particularly the satkona mandala (hexagram) that in the Indian tradition means the interdependence and fusion of masculine and feminine principles.

The sculpture is symbolic of Shiva as the lord of dance and dramatic arts, with its style and proportions made according to Hindu texts on arts. It typically shows Shiva dancing in one of the Natya Shastra poses, holding Agni (fire) in his left back hand, the front hand in gajahasta (elephant hand) or dandahasta (stick hand) mudra, the front right hand with a wrapped snake that is in abhaya (fear not) mudra while pointing to a Sutra text, and the back hand holding a musical instrument, usually a Udukai. His body, fingers, ankles, neck, face, head, ear lobes and dress are shown decorated with symbolic items, which vary with historic period and region. He is surrounded by a ring of flames, standing on a lotus pedestal, lifting his left leg (or in rare cases, the right leg) and balancing / trampling upon a demon shown as a dwarf (Apasmara or Muyalaka) who symbolizes spiritual ignorance. The dynamism of the energetic dance is depicted with the whirling hair which spread out in thin strands as a fan behind his head. The details in the Nataraja artwork have been variously interpreted by Indian scholars since the 12th century for its symbolic meaning and theological essence. Nataraja is a well known sculptural symbol in India and popularly used as a symbol of Indian culture, in particular as one of the finest illustrations of Hindu art.

Symbolism
The symbolism has been interpreted in classical Indian Shaiva Siddhanta texts such as Unmai Vilakkam, Mummani Kovai, Tirukuttu Darshana and Tiruvatavurar Puranam, dating from the 12th century CE (Chola empire) and later, and include:
 He dances within a circular or cyclically closed arch of flames (prabha mandala), which symbolically represent the cosmic fire that in Hindu cosmology creates everything and consumes everything, in cyclic existence or cycle of life. The fire also represents the evils, dangers, heat, warmth, light and joys of daily life. The arch of fire emerges from two makara (mythical water beasts) on each end.
 He looks calm, even through the continuous chain of creation and destruction that maintains the universe, that shows the supreme tranquility of the Atma.
 His legs are bent, which suggests an energetic dance. His long, matted tresses, are shown to be loose and flying out in thin strands during the dance, spread into a fan behind his head, because of the wildness and ecstasy of the dance.
 On his right side, meshed in with one of the flying strands of his hair near his forehead, is typically the river Ganges personified as a goddess, from the Hindu mythology where the danger of a mighty river is creatively tied to a calm river for the regeneration of life.

 His headdress often features a human skull (symbol of mortality), a crescent moon and a flower identified as that of the entheogenic plant Datura metel.
Four-armed figures are most typical, but ten-armed forms are also found from various places and periods, for example the Badami Caves and Ankor Wat.
A specific hand gesture (mudra) called  (Sanskrit for "-hand") is used to hold the drum. It symbolizes rhythm and time.
 The upper left hand contains Agni or fire, which signifies forces of creation and destruction. The opposing concepts show the counterpoise nature of life.
 A cobra uncoils from his lower right forearm, while his palm shows the Abhaya mudra (meaning fearlessness in Sanskrit), suggesting not to fear nearby evil, as well as evil and ignorance surrounding the devotee as he or she follows the righteousness of dharma.
 The lower left hand is bent downwards at the wrist with the palm facing inward, we also note that this arm crosses Naṭarāja’s chest, concealing his heart from view. It represents tirodhāna, which means “occlusion, concealment.”
 The face shows two eyes plus a slightly open third on the forehead, which symbolize the triune in Shaivism. The eyes represent the sun, the moon and the third has been interpreted as the inner eye, or symbol of knowledge (jnana), urging the viewer to seek the inner wisdom, self-realization. The three eyes alternatively symbolize an equilibrium of the three Guṇas: Sattva, Rajas and Tamas.
 The dwarf upon whom Nataraja dances is the demon Apasmara purusha (Muyalaka, as he is known in Tamil), and who symbolises the demonic evil and ignorance over which the sacred dance of Shiva gives victory.
 The slightly smiling face of Shiva represents his calmness despite being immersed in the contrasting forces of universe and his energetic dance.

Padma Kaimal questions some of these interpretations by referring to a 10th-century text and Nataraja icons, suggesting that the Nataraja statue may have symbolized different things to different people or in different contexts, such as Shiva being the lord of cremation or as an emblem of Chola dynasty. In contrast, Sharada Srinivasan questions the link to Chola, and has presented archaeological evidence suggesting that Nataraja bronzes and dancing Shiva artwork in South India was a Pallava innovation, tracing back to 7th to 9th-centuries, and its symbolism should be pushed back by a few centuries.

Meaning

Shiva's dance can be explained as:
 First, it is seen as the image of his rhythmic or musical play which is the source of all movement within the universe. This is represented by the circular or elliptical frame surrounding Shiva.
 Secondly, the purpose of his dance is to release the souls of all men from the snare of illusion.
 Lastly, the place of the dance, Chidambaram, which is portrayed as the center of the universe,  is actually within the heart.

Nataraja, states James Lochtefeld, symbolizes "the connection between religion and the arts", and it represents Shiva as the lord of dance, encompassing all "creation, destruction and all things in between". The Nataraja iconography incorporates contrasting elements, a fearless celebration of the joys of dance while being surrounded by fire, untouched by forces of ignorance and evil, signifying a spirituality that transcends all duality. Furthermore, according to Carole and Pasquale, the deity not only tells of the eternal cycles of life (Jiva) from destruction to rebirth, but also a human being should conquer the spiritual ignorance and thrill in self-realization.

In the hymn of Manikkavacakar's Thiruvasagam, he testifies that at Nataraja Temple, Chidambaram had, by the pre-Chola period, an abstract or 'cosmic' symbolism linked to five elements (Pancha Bhoota) including ether. Nataraja is a significant visual interpretation of Brahman and a dance posture of Shiva. The details in the Nataraja artwork have attracted commentaries and secondary literature such as poems detailing its theological significance. It is one of the widely studied and supreme illustrations of Hindu art from the medieval era.

Srinivasan notes that Nataraja is described as Satcitananda or "Being, Consciousness and Bliss" in the Shaiva Siddhanta text Kunchitangrim Bhaje, resembling the Advaita doctrine, or "abstract monism," of Adi Shankara, "which holds the individual Self (Jīvātman) and supream Self (Paramātmā) to be one," while "an earlier hymn to Nataraja by Manikkavachakar identifies him with the unitary supreme consciousness, by using Tamil word Or Unarve, rather than Sanskrit Chit." This may point to an "osmosis" of ideas in medieval India.

History

Stone reliefs depicting the classical form of Nataraja are found in numerous cave temples of India, such  as at the Ellora Caves (Maharashtra), the Elephanta Caves, and the Badami Caves  (Karnataka), by around the 6th century. One of the earliest known Nataraja artworks has been found in the archaeological site at Asanapat village in Odisha, which includes an inscription, and is dated to about the 6th century CE. The Asanapat inscription also mentions a Shiva temple in the Saivacaryas kingdom.

Literary evidences shows that the bronze representation of Shiva's ananda-tandava appeared first in the Pallava period between 7th century and mid-9th centuries CE. Nataraja was worshipped at Chidambaram during the Pallava period with underlying philosophical concepts of cosmic cycles of creation and destruction, which is also found in Tamil saint Manikkavacakar's Thiruvasagam.

Archaeological discoveries have yielded a red Nataraja sandstone statue, from 9th to 10th century from Ujjain, Madhya Pradesh, now held at the Gwalior Archaeological Museum. Similarly, Nataraja artwork has been found in archaeological sites in the Himalayan region such as Kashmir, albeit in with somewhat different dance pose and iconography, such as just two arms or with eight arms.

Around the 10th century, it emerged in Tamil Nadu in its mature and best-known expression in Chola bronzes, of various heights typically less than four feet, some over. Nataraja reliefs are found in historic settings in many parts of South East Asia such as Ankor Wat, and in Bali, Cambodia, and central Asia. The oldest free-standing stone sculptures of Nataraja were built by Chola queen Sembiyan Mahadevi. Nataraja gained special significance and became a symbol of royalty in Tamil Nadu. The dancing Shiva became a part of Chola era processions and religious festivals, a practice that continued thereafter.

The depiction was informed of cosmic or metaphysical connotations is also argued on the basis of the testimony of the hymns of Tamil saints.

In medieval era artworks and texts on dancing Shiva found in Nepal, Assam and Bengal, he is sometimes shown as dancing on his vahana (animal vehicle) Nandi, the bull; further, he is regionally known as Narteshvara. Nataraja artwork have also been discovered in Gujarat, Kerala and Andhra Pradesh.

In the contemporary Hindu culture of Bali in Indonesia, Siwa (Shiva) Nataraja is the god who created dance. Siwa and his dance as Nataraja was also celebrated in the art of Java Indonesia when Hinduism thrived there, while in Cambodia he was referred to as Nrittesvara.

In 2004, a 2-m statue of the dancing Shiva was unveiled at CERN, the European Center for Research in Particle Physics in Geneva. The statue, symbolizing Shiva's cosmic dance of creation and destruction, was given to CERN by the Indian government to celebrate the research center's long association with India. A special plaque next to the Shiva statue explains the metaphor of Shiva's cosmic dance with quotations from physicist Fritjof Capra:
Hundreds of years ago, Indian artists created visual images of dancing Shivas in a beautiful series of bronzes. In our time, physicists have used the most advanced technology to portray the patterns of the cosmic dance. The metaphor of the cosmic dance thus unifies ancient mythology, religious art and modern physics.

Though named "Nataraja bronzes" in Western literature, the Chola Nataraja artworks are mostly in copper, and a few are in brass, typically cast by the cire-perdue (lost-wax casting) process.

Nataraja is celebrated in 108 poses of Bharatanatyam, with Sanskrit inscriptions from Natya Shastra, at the Nataraja temple in Chidambaram, Tamil Nadu, India.

According to Ian Crawford, professor of planetary science at University of London, the cosmic dance of Shiva as Nataraja represents particle physics, entropy and the dissolution of the universe.

Gallery

In dance and yoga

In modern yoga as exercise, Natarajasana is a posture resembling Nataraja and named for him in the 20th century. A similar pose appears in the classical Indian dance form Bharatanatyam.

References

Notes

Further reading

External links

 Śiva's Dance: Iconography and Dance Practice in South and Southeast Asia, Alessandra Iyer (2000), Music in Art
 Shiva Nataraja Iconography, Freer Sackler Gallery, Smithsonian
 Nataraja: India's Cycle of Fire, Stephen Pyne (1994)
 Chidambareswarar Nataraja Temple
 Nataraja Image Archive

Forms of Shiva
Hindu dance traditions
Tamil deities
Indian art
Indian sculpture
Hindu iconography
Articles containing video clips
Shiva in art